Hanna Balabanova (born 10 December 1969) is a Ukrainian sprint canoeist who competed from the late 1990s to the mid-2000s (decade). Competing in three Summer Olympics, she won a bronze medal in the K-4 500 m event at Athens in 2004.

Balabanova also won a bronze medal in the K-4 1000 m event at the 2001 ICF Canoe Sprint World Championships in Poznań.

References

1969 births
Canoeists at the 1996 Summer Olympics
Canoeists at the 2000 Summer Olympics
Canoeists at the 2004 Summer Olympics
Living people
Olympic canoeists of Ukraine
Olympic bronze medalists for Ukraine
Ukrainian female canoeists
Olympic medalists in canoeing
ICF Canoe Sprint World Championships medalists in kayak
Medalists at the 2004 Summer Olympics
Recipients of the Honorary Diploma of the Cabinet of Ministers of Ukraine